Susani may refer to several villages in Romania:

 Susani, a village in Ignești Commune, Arad County
 Susani, a village in Traian Vuia Commune, Timiș County
 Șușani, a commune in Vâlcea County.
 Susani - goddess from India

Or, in music, to
 Susani, another name for the song Vom Himmel hoch, o Engel, kommt